Decommunization in Ukraine started during the dissolution of the Soviet Union in 1991. After the Revolution of Dignity in 2014, the Ukrainian government approved laws that outlawed communist symbols.

In May 2015, President of Ukraine Petro Poroshenko signed a set of laws that started a six-month period for the removal of communist monuments (excluding World War II monuments) and the renaming of public places with communist-related names. In May, the OSCE expressed concern that the laws could negatively impact the freedom of the press in Ukraine.

The following July, the Ministry of the Interior stripped the Communist Party of Ukraine, the Communist Party of Ukraine (renewed), and the Communist Party of Workers and Peasants of their right to participate in elections and stated it was continuing the court actions that started in July 2014 to end the registration of communist parties in Ukraine. In December 2015, these parties were banned; the Communist Party of Ukraine appealed the ban in court. The Communist Party continued to participate in elections by joining umbrella groups and running candidates as independents, while the two other parties did not contest their banning. The Communist Party was banned outright and had its assets seized in July 2022, during the Russian invasion of Ukraine.

By 2016, 51,493 streets and 987 cities and villages were renamed, and 1,320 Lenin monuments and 1,069 monuments to other communist figures removed.

History

An unofficial decommunization process started in Ukraine after the dissolution of the Soviet Union and the following independence of Ukraine in 1991. Decommunization was carried out much more ruthlessly and visibly in the former Soviet Union's Baltic states and Warsaw Pact countries outside the Soviet Union. Ukraine's first president after the country's 1991 independence from the Soviet Union, Leonid Kravchuk, had also issued orders aimed at "de-sovietisation" in the early 1990s. The following years, although at a slow rate, historical monuments to Soviet leaders were removed in Ukraine; this process went on much further in the Ukrainian-speaking western regions than in the industrialised, largely Russian-speaking eastern regions. Decommunization laws were drafted in the Ukrainian parliament in 2002, 2005, 2009, 2011, and 2013, but they all failed to materialize.

During and after Euromaidan, starting with the fall of the monument to Lenin in Kyiv on 8 December 2013, several Lenin monuments and statues were removed or destroyed by protesters.

In April 2014, a year before the formal, nationwide decommunization process in Ukraine local authorities removed and altered communist symbols and place names, as in Dnipropetrovsk.

On 9 April 2015, the Ukrainian parliament passed legislation on decommunization. It was submitted by the Second Yatsenyuk Government, banning the promotion of symbols of "Communist and National Socialist totalitarian regimes". One of the main provisions of the bill was the recognition of the Soviet Union's regime as "criminal" and one that "pursued a state terror policy". The legislation prohibits the use of communist symbols and propaganda and also bans all symbols and propaganda of national-socialism and its values and any activities of Nazi or fascist groups in Ukraine. The ban applies to monuments, place and street names. The ban does not apply to World War II monuments and when symbols are located in a cemetery. Expressing pro-communist views was not made illegal. The ban on communist symbols did result in the removal of hundreds of statues, the replacement of street signs and the renaming of populated places including some of Ukraine's biggest cities like Dnipro. The city administration of Dnipro estimated in June 2015 that 80 streets, embankments, squares, and boulevards would have to be renamed. Maxim Eristavi of Hromadske.TV estimated late April 2015 that the nationwide renaming would cost around $1.5 billion. The legislation also granted special legal status to veterans of the "struggle for Ukrainian independence" from 1917 to 1991 (the lifespan of the Soviet Union). The same day, the parliament also passed a law that replaced the term "Great Patriotic War" in the national lexicon with "World War II" from 1939 to 1945 (instead of 1941–45 as is the case with the "Great Patriotic War"), a change of great significance.

On 15 May 2015, President of Ukraine Petro Poroshenko signed the Decommunisation Laws. This started a six-month period for the removal of communist monuments and renaming of public places named after communist-related themes.

The Ukrainian decommunization law applies, but is not limited to:
 the Flag of the Soviet Union
 the flags of the Ukrainian Soviet Socialist Republic and of the 14 other republics of the Soviet Union, as well as the flags of the socialist countries of Eastern Europe and abroad
 the State Emblem of the Soviet Union and its constituent republics as well as the socialist countries of Eastern Europe and abroad
 the State Anthem of the Soviet Union and the republics
 the Red star
 the Hammer and sickle
 images bearing the likeness of Vladimir Lenin, Leon Trotsky, Joseph Stalin, Mao Zedong, Kim Il-sung, and Che Guevara
 military uniforms

The laws were published in Holos Ukrayiny on 20 May 2015; this made them come into force officially the next day.

On 3 June 2015, the Ukrainian Institute of National Memory published a list of 22 cities and 44 villages subject to renaming. By far most of these places were in the Donbas region in East Ukraine; the others were situated in Central Ukraine and South Ukraine. Under the Decommunisation Laws the municipal governments had until 21 November 2015 to change the name of the settlement they govern. For settlements that failed to rename, the provincial authorities had until 21 May 2016 to change the name. If after that date the settlement still retained its old name the Cabinet of Ministers of Ukraine renamed the settlement.

In a 24 July 2015 decree based on the decommunization laws, the Ukrainian Interior Ministry stripped the Communist Party of Ukraine, Communist Party of Ukraine (renewed) and Communist Party of Workers and Peasants of their right to participate in elections and it stated it was continuing the court actions (that started in July 2014) to end the registration of Ukraine's communist parties.

On 30 September 2015, the District Administrative Court in Kyiv banned the parties Communist Party of Workers and Peasants and Communist Party of Ukraine (renewed); they both did not appeal.

In October 2015, a statue of Lenin in Odessa was converted into a statue of Star Wars villain Darth Vader.

On 16 December 2015, the Kyiv District Administrative Court validated the claim of the Ministry of Justice in full, banning the activities of the Communist Party of Ukraine. The party appealed this ban at the European Court of Human Rights.

In March 2016, statues of Lenin, Felix Dzerzhinsky, Sergey Kirov and a Komsomol monument were removed or taken down in the eastern city of Zaporizhia. The statue overlooking the Dnieper Hydroelectric Station (formerly named Lenin Dam) was the largest remaining Lenin statue in Ukraine.

On 19 May 2016, the Ukrainian parliament voted to rename Ukraine's fourth-largest city Dnipropetrovsk to "Dnipro". The renaming of various locations was signed into the law on 20 May 2016.

The Ukrainian parliament declared in July 2016 that the new names of places in Crimea, under full Russian control since the 2014 Russian annexation of Crimea, "will enter force with the return of temporarily occupied territory of the Autonomous Republic of Crimea and Sevastopol under the general jurisdiction of Ukraine."

In May 2017, 46 Ukrainian MPs, mainly from the Opposition Bloc faction, appealed to the Constitutional Court of Ukraine to declare the 2015 decommunization laws unconstitutional.

Director of the Ukrainian Institute of National Remembrance Volodymyr Viatrovych stated in February 2018 that "De-communism in the context of depriving the symbols of the totalitarian regime has actually been completed". Although according to him the city of Kyiv was lagging behind.

In February 2019, the Central Election Commission of Ukraine refused to register the candidacy of (leader of Communist Party) Petro Symonenko for the 2019 Ukrainian presidential election due to the fact that the statute, name and symbolism of the Communist Party of Ukraine did not comply with the 2015 decommunization laws. Symonenko appealed the decision, but the court of appeal confirmed decision of the Central Election Commission of Ukraine. During the same month of February, it was announced that the oblast of Dnipropetrovsk would be renamed to "Sicheslav" in the future.

On 16 July 2019, the Constitutional Court of Ukraine upheld the 2015 Ukrainian decommunization laws.

On 7 November 2020 in the village Mala Rohan, an Emblem of the Ukrainian Soviet Socialist Republic was dismantled from the facade of a school.

On 27 April 2022 (during the 2022 Russian invasion of Ukraine), the  Soviet-era bronze statue under the People's Friendship Arch in Kyiv, representing Russian–Ukrainian friendship, was removed by order of Mayor of Kyiv Vitali Klitschko.

Criticism

On 18 May 2015, the OSCE expressed concern that the laws could negatively impact the freedom of the press in Ukraine. The OSCE also regretted what it perceived as a lack of opportunity of civil society to participate in public discussions about the laws.

The Kharkiv Human Rights Protection Group stated (in May 2015) the laws "(one of which) effectively criminalizes public expression of views held by many Ukrainians".

Russian lawmakers have argued (in April 2015) that it was "cynical" to put communist and Nazi symbol on par with each other, and pro-Russian rebels in Donbas (a region in eastern Ukraine) have condemned the law. The then head of the Donetsk People's Republic Alexander Zakharchenko stated in late February 2016 that when renamed cities "return under our jurisdiction", they would be renamed to their pre-decommunized name.

On 18 December 2015, the Venice Commission stated that Ukraine's decommunization laws did not comply with European legislative standards. It was in particular critical about the banning of communist parties.

In February 2022, in connection with a presidential address of Russian president Vladimir Putin in the midst of the Russo-Ukrainian crisis, Putin claimed that Ukraine's decommunization does not make any sense because "modern Ukraine was created by communist Russia, and specifically Lenin". Vitaly Chervonenko from the BBC noted how carefully Putin kept silent about the independent Ukrainian state formations of 1917–1920 and Kyiv's war with Lenin's Bolshevik government, whose purpose was to include Ukraine in Bolshevik Russia.

Results

Since 16 December 2015 three communist parties are banned in Ukraine (the Communist Party of Ukraine, Communist Party of Ukraine (renewed) and Communist Party of Workers and Peasants). The only party that appealed this ban was the Communist Party of Ukraine; this resulted in the court's decision to ban the Communist Party of Ukraine did not come into force. However, the April 2015 decommunization law contains a norm that allows the Ministry of Justice to prohibit the Communist Party from participating in elections.

Ukraine had 5,500 Lenin monuments in 1991, declining to 1,300 by December 2015. More than 700 Lenin monuments were removed and/or destroyed from February 2014 (when 376 came down) to December 2015. On 16 January 2017 the Ukrainian Institute of National Remembrance announced that 1,320 Lenin monuments were dismantled during decommunization.

On 16 January 2017, the Ukrainian Institute of National Remembrance stated that 51,493 streets, squares and "other facilities" had been renamed due to decommunization. By June 2016 there were renamed 19 raions, 27 urban districts, 29 cities, 48 urban-type settlements, 119 rural settlements and 711 villages. The fourth largest city was renamed from Dnipropetrovsk to Dnipro. In the second-largest city of Ukraine, Kharkiv, more than 200 streets, 5 administrative raions, 4 parks and 1 metro station had been renamed by early February 2016. In all of 2016 51,493 streets and 987 cities and villages were renamed, 25 raions were renamed and 1,320 Lenin monuments and 1,069 monuments to other communist figures removed. In some villages Lenin statues were remade into "non-communist historical figures" to save money. One of the most prominent examples was Lenin monument in Odessa, which was remade into the monument to Darth Vader.

In February 2019, The Guardian reported that the two Lenin statues in the Chernobyl Exclusion Zone were the only two remaining statues of Lenin in Ukraine, if not taking into account occupied territories of Ukraine. In January 2021 "Radio Free Europe/Radio Liberty" located three remaining Lenin statues in three (Ukrainian controlled) small villages.

In January 2021, 24 Ukrainian streets were still named after former cosmonaut Valentina Tereshkova (6 of them in parts of Ukrainian not under government control), according to the 2015 decommunization laws they should have been renamed. The last Lenin statue in Ukraine (excluding territories currently annexed by Russia or occupied by separatists) was demolished in Stari Troyany, Izmail Raion, Odessa Oblast on 27 January 2021.

The director of the Ukrainian Institute of National Remembrance Volodymyr Viatrovych stated in February 2018 that the still existing Soviet hammer and sickle on the shield of the Motherland Monument in Kyiv should be removed to comply with the country's decommunization laws and replace it with the Ukrainian trident.

During the 2022 Russian invasion of Ukraine, many Lenin statues across Ukraine, which had been taken down by the Ukrainians in the preceding years, were re-erected by the Russians in the Russian-controlled areas.

Polling
A November 2016 poll, showed that 48% of respondents supported a ban on Communist ideology in Ukraine, 36% were against it and 16% were undecided. It also showed that 41% of respondents supported the initiative to dismantle all monuments to Lenin in the country, whereas 48% were against it and 11% were undecided.

As of 8 April 2022, according to a poll by the sociological group Rating, 76% of Ukrainians support the initiative to rename streets and other objects whose names are associated with the Soviet Union and Russia after the 2022 Russian invasion of Ukraine.

See also

 Bans on communist symbols
 Decommunization
 Human rights in Ukraine
 List of communist monuments damaged during Euromaidan
 List of communist monuments in Ukraine
 List of Ukrainian toponyms that were changed as part of decommunization in 2016
 Lustration in Ukraine
 Derussification in Ukraine

Notes

References

External links
 Interactive map of settlements that need to be renamed 
 Results decommunisation in the Donetsk oblast 2015-2016, pdf (05/01/2016) 

 
2015 in Ukraine
2016 in Ukraine
Anti-communism in Ukraine
Decommunization
Euromaidan
Human rights in Ukraine
 
Political controversies in Ukraine
Political history of Ukraine
Political repression in Ukraine
Politics of Ukraine
Ukrainian nationalism